Novelda is a town located in the province of Alicante, Spain. , it has a total population of 27,135 inhabitants.

Novelda has important quarries and mines of marble, limestone, silica, clay and gypsum. It is a major centre of the marble industry.

It was probably settled by Greeks, although it was controlled by Carthaginians and Romans. Some centuries later it was conquered from the Moors by a son of Ferdinand III of Castile.

Places of tourist interest in Novelda include the monastery of Santa María Magdalena (dated from the 19th century), which has a church designed by a disciple of Antoni Gaudí, the Moorish castle of the Mola, with its unique triangular tower, and the Museum of Modernism. This is a well preserved art nouveau house with original artifacts from the 1920s. The house itself is a work of art. The House-Museum is located in a modernist building designed by Pedro Cerdan Martinez (1863-1947) and is now a centre for modernist research and promotion. There are also several natural and salty lakes to visit in the surroundings.

Notable people 
 Mario Gaspar, footballer
 Fernando Béjar (born 6 October 1980), former footballer

See also 
Route of the Castles of Vinalopó

References

External links
 Novelda Landmarks 
 Novelda Online 
 Museo Modernista 

Municipalities in the Province of Alicante